Ben Bates may refer to:

Ben Bates (actor), an actor who appeared in Swamp Thing and Ruckus
Ben Bates, an American professional golfer
MV Ben Bates, a British coastal tanker built in 1956